Chad Hayes (born April 21, 1961) is an American screenwriter and producer, and twin brother of Carey Hayes. They are writing partners, and wrote such films as the 2005 remake of House of Wax, The Reaping (2007) and The Conjuring (2013). He and Carey also starred in Doublemint gum commercials in their childhood.

Personal life
Hayes was born April 21, 1961, in Portland, Oregon, the identical twin brother of Carey Hayes. They were raised Baptist. Chad has two children: Dylan and Hanna.

Filmography

Film

Television

References

External links

1961 births
Living people
Writers from Portland, Oregon
American twins
American male screenwriters
American television writers
American male television writers
American television producers
American male film actors
Male actors from Oregon
Screenwriters from Oregon